The Four Evangelists may refer to one of two paintings:
The Four Evangelists (Jordaens), 1625, Jacob Jordaens
The Four Evangelists (Preti), 1656-1660, Mattia Preti